The Union for the New Republic  (UPNR)  is a political party in Gabon led by Louis-Gaston Mayila.

History
The party was established by Mayila in July 2007. It supported Pierre Mamboundou of the Union of the Gabonese People in the 2009 presidential elections.
In the 2011 parliamentary elections it received 1.2% of the vote, winning one seat.

References

Political parties in Gabon
Political parties established in 2007
2007 establishments in Gabon